Steve Holmes (born 23 March 1961) is a German pornographic actor, producer and director. He has received several adult industry awards, including the AVN Award for Male Foreign Performer of the Year in 2005 and 2006. In 2017, Holmes was inducted into the AVN Hall of Fame.

Early life
Holmes was born to Transylvanian Saxon parents in Sibiu, Romania. In the summer of 1968, while on holiday in Bulgaria, Holmes and his family crossed the Turkish border. Upon arrival at the Federal Republic of Germany in Istanbul, they sought political asylum. Holmes eventually returned to Romania to visit family.

After dropping out of school, Holmes began working in fashion. He eventually became an assistant buyer for several clothing stores. While attending a computer show in Munich, he decided to enter the tech industry. On 1 January 1986, Holmes started working as a sales representative for an IT company. He continued to work in the tech industry for several years.

Career

Holmes spent most of 1996 attempting to break into the adult film industry with little success. Prior to performing in porn, Holmes sought permission from his wife. On 22 November 1996, he performed in his first pornographic scene in Dortmund, Germany. The scene was part of an amateur series called Have a Wish. Holmes wasn't compensated for the shoot. While giving an interview, he was instructed by a reporter to adopt the stage name "Steve Holmes" due to his similar appearance to that of actor John Holmes.

In 2001, Holmes won the NINFA Award for Best Supporting Actor at the Barcelona International Erotic Film Festival. That same year, he met Manuel Ferrara on a shoot for Rocco Siffredi. After hitting it off, the two went on to produce the film series Euro Girls Never Say No and The Pussy Is Not Enough. In 2003, Holmes performed in over 280 scenes. That same year, Holmes became one of five charter directors for Platinum X Pictures; other notable directors included Jewel De'Nyle, Michael Stefano and Ferrara.

In 2004, Holmes received the XRCO Award for Unsung Swordsman. He also received the AVN Award for Male Foreign Performer of the Year for two consecutive years in 2005 and 2006. In 2006, Holmes signed a directing deal with Mach 2 Entertainment to direct one film a month. In late 2007, he performed in his first scene featuring bondage for Kink.com. He developed the site Public Disgrace with fellow performer Princess Donna. In May 2020, Holmes launched his own website, which features an archive of over 3,000 scenes he's performed in throughout his career.

Personal life
In 2017, Holmes and his wife celebrated 26 years of marriage. He currently resides in California. He is close friends with directors Greg Lansky and Mike Adriano.

While shooting a scene for Public Disgrace in Barcelona, Holmes and Princess Donna were arrested by local authorities. The two were released shortly after.

Awards

References

External links 
 
 
 

1961 births
German male pornographic film actors
German pornographic film directors
German pornographic film producers
Living people
People from Sibiu
Transylvanian Saxon people
Romanian emigrants to Germany
German expatriates in the United States